Sipunculidae is a family of peanut worms.

Species

Phascolopsis
 Phascolopsis gouldii (De Pourtalés, 1851)

Siphonomecus
 Siphonomecus multicinctus Fisher 1947

Siphonosoma
 Siphonosoma arcassonense (Cuenot, 1902)
 Siphonosoma australe (Keferstein, 1865)
 Siphonosoma boholense (Selenka, de Man & Bülow, 1883)
 Siphonosoma cumanense (Keferstein, 1867)
 Siphonosoma dayi Stephen 1942
 Siphonosoma funafuti (Shipley, 1898)
 Siphonosoma ingens (Fisher, 1952)
 Siphonosoma mourense Satô, 1930
 Siphonosoma rotumanum (Shipley, 1898)
 Siphonosoma vastum (Selenka & Bülow, 1883)

Sipunculus
 Sipunculus indicus Peters, 1850
 Sipunculus lomonossovi Murina 1968
 Sipunculus longipapillosus Murina 1968
 Sipunculus marcusi Ditadi 1976
 Sipunculus mundanus Selenka and Bulow, 1883
 Sipunculus norvegicus Danielssen, 1869
 Sipunculus nudus Linnaeus, 1766
 Sipunculus phalloides (Pallas, 1774)
 Sipunculus polymyotus Fisher 1947
 Sipunculus robustus Keferstein 1865

Xenosiphon
 Xenosiphon absconditus Saiz 1984
 Xenosiphon branchiatus (Fischer, 1895)

References

Sipunculans
Annelid families